Brandon T. Siler (born December 5, 1985) is an American former college and professional football player who was a linebacker in the National Football League (NFL) for six seasons.  He played college football for the University of Florida, where he was a member of a BCS National Championship team.  He was chosen by the San Diego Chargers in the seventh round of the 2007 NFL Draft, and also played for the NFL's Kansas City Chiefs

Early years
Siler was born Daytona Beach, Florida.  He attended Evans High School in Orlando, Florida, where he was a star high school football player for the Evans Trojans. His grandfather, Herb Siler, was a heavyweight boxer in the 1960s.

College career
Siler accepted a scholarship to attend his home-state University of Florida in Gainesville, Florida, where he played for coach Ron Zook and coach Urban Meyer's Florida Gators football from 2004 to 2006.  His impact was felt early, as he started six games as a freshman, and he was recognized as the Southeastern Conference (SEC) Freshman of the Year.  The Gators' new head coach Urban Meyer replaced Zook for Siler's sophomore season in 2005, and Siler amassed seven fumble recoveries.  His play during his junior season in 2006 helped the 13–1 Gators win the SEC Championship Game and the 2007 BCS National Championship Game, and he earned second-team All-SEC and third-team All-American honors from the Associated Press.  Siler was known for his work-ethic, energy and leadership on the field.

Professional career

Siler was projected as a second–to–third round selection in the 2007 NFL Draft.  However, he was drafted by the San Diego Chargers 240th overall in the seventh and final round of the 2007 NFL Draft.

Siler, who also served as the Chargers backup long snapper, earned a spot on the Chargers roster and in 2007, he contributed on special teams, gathering the second highest number of special teams tackles.  In 2008, he continued excelling on special teams and received more time on defense.  His playing time expanded with the four-game suspension of Stephen Cooper.

On July 31, 2011, Siler signed with the Kansas City Chiefs.  He was placed on the injured reserve list due to an Achilles tendon rupture on August 25, and appeared in no games during the 2011 season.  Siler played in 16 games in 2012, starting four of them.  His contract expired after the 2012 NFL season, and he was not re-signed.  In five NFL seasons, Siler played in 74 games, started 16 of them, and compiled 180 tackles, two interceptions and three recovered fumbles.

See also

 2006 Florida Gators football team
 History of the San Diego Chargers
 List of Florida Gators football All-Americans
 List of Florida Gators in the NFL Draft
 List of Kansas City Chiefs players

References

Bibliography
 Carlson, Norm, University of Florida Football Vault: The History of the Florida Gators, Whitman Publishing, LLC, Atlanta, Georgia (2007).  .

External links

  Brandon Siler – Florida Gators player profile
  Brandon Siler – San Diego Chargers player profile

1985 births
Living people
American football linebackers
Florida Gators football players
Kansas City Chiefs players
Players of American football from Florida
Sportspeople from Daytona Beach, Florida
San Diego Chargers players